Walter Zeller (born 11 September 1927 in Ebersberg; died 4 February 1995) was a former Grand Prix motorcycle road racer from (Germany) who rode for the BMW factory racing team. His best year was in  when he finished the season second in the 500cc world championship behind John Surtees.

Motorcycle Grand Prix results 

(key) (Races in bold indicate pole position; races in italics indicate fastest lap)

References

1927 births
1995 deaths
German motorcycle racers
500cc World Championship riders
Isle of Man TT riders
People from Ebersberg (district)
Sportspeople from Upper Bavaria